Esso Petroleum Co Ltd v Commissioners of Customs and Excise [1975] UKHL 4 is an English contract law case, concerning the rule of creation of legal relations in English law.

Facts
Esso offered a World Cup coin with likenesses of the England 1970 squad players, given to every motorist buying over four gallons of petrol. HM Customs & Excise argued these coins should have purchase tax charged on them because they were ‘produced in quantity for general sale.’

Judgment

Court of Appeal
Lord Denning MR said it was amazing that this case had got so far. He said the coins were not 'sold'.

House of Lords
The House of Lords (Lord Fraser dissenting) agreed with the Court of Appeal that the petrol, not the coins, was being sold. But, then, on the question of whether the coins were being given under a contractual obligation, or as a mere gift, Lord Simon of Glaisdale, Lord Wilberforce and Lord Fraser agreed there was intention to create legal relations, given the heavy onus of proof to show a bargain was not intended. Lord Russell and Viscount Dilhorne dissented on this point, saying that the language in the poster advertisements that the coins were 'going free' and the minimal value of the coins indicated no intention to create legal relations.

See also
 English contract law

Notes

References
From  the  English law report the case is similar to Tanzania case from HCD Marwa vs Malanganila HCD (2019) where by Malanganila won the case against the republic

English contract case law
House of Lords cases
1975 in case law
1975 in British law
Lord Wilberforce cases
Standard Oil